"Dollar" (stylized in all caps) is a song recorded by American singer Becky G and Puerto Rican rapper and singer Myke Towers. It was released by Kemosabe Records, RCA Records and Sony Music Latin on July 10, 2019 as the fourth single from Gomez's debut album Mala Santa (2019). The track was written by Gomez and Myke Towers.

Music video
The music video was released on July 12. It features Gomez counting money in various outfits. These scenes are spliced with Towers in a meeting with other people and appearing to be mad about something while Gomez waits in a room next door.

Gomez later retweeted a fan tweet, giving their own interpretation of the clip, stating that it represents the singer's internal situation with her labels: they keep promising her things, like letting her release an album, but Gomez doesn't believe their words anymore (alluding to the line "No pago mi renta con palabras/ no valen nada"). Towers' character is her lawyer/manager trying to get the executives to finally let her release an album, but fails.

Live performance
Gomez performed the song live for the first time at the Amazon Music's 2019 Prime Day Concert. She later sang the song at the Latin American Music Awards of 2019 on October 17, the day of her debut album's release.

Charts

Year-end charts

Certifications

References

2019 singles
2019 songs
Becky G songs
Spanish-language songs
Songs written by Becky G
Songs written by Nate Campany
Songs written by Elena Rose
Myke Towers songs
Songs written by Edgar Semper
Songs written by Xavier Semper